Wormy may refer to:
 Wormy (comic strip), a comic strip by David A. Trampier that appeared in Dragon magazine
 "Wormy", an episode of season 2 of SpongeBob SquarePants 
 Wormy, a character from the comic book Owly by Andy Runton
 Wormy, a character from the movie The Sin of Harold Diddlebock played by Jimmy Conlin
 Wormy Marrons, a  1940s Dick Tracy villain
 Uncle Wormy, an imaginary friend in the cartoon series Arthur